Russ Hochstein (born October 7, 1977) is a former American football Center. After playing college football for Nebraska, he was drafted by the Tampa Bay Buccaneers in the fifth round of the 2001 NFL Draft. He played for the Buccaneers for two seasons from 2001 to 2002 (but was released in 2002 before the team won the Super Bowl), the New England Patriots for seven seasons from 2002 to 2008 (earning two Super Bowl rings with the team), and the Denver Broncos for three seasons from 2009 to 2011.

Early years
Hochstein was born in Hartington, Nebraska and is a graduate of Cedar Catholic High School, where he was an award-winning performer in school plays, and a letterman in football, basketball, and track and field. In football, he played the offensive line, defensive line and middle linebacker positions, and finished his high school career with 18 sacks, 309 tackles, eight fumble recoveries, and two interceptions.

Professional career

Tampa Bay Buccaneers
Hochstein was selected by the Tampa Bay Buccaneers in the fifth round of the 2001 NFL Draft.

New England Patriots
Hochstein signed with the New England Patriots in 2002. He started in 2003 after Damien Woody (who had moved from Center to fill in for the injured Mike Compton) was injured in the first round of the playoffs. After Damien Woody left for Detroit in the 2004 offseason, Hochstein started the first two games of the 2004 season before filling in at Tight End, Offensive Tackle and Fullback in the remaining regular season games and Super Bowl XXXIX. Hochstein started the final seven games of the 2005 season at center when Dan Koppen was injured and started a career high eight games in 2007 at center and right guard for the New England Patriots. He remained a special teams contributor and first choice backup interior offensive lineman.

Denver Broncos

Hochstein was traded to the Denver Broncos in exchange for a seventh-round selection (which the Patriots had sent with Le Kevin Smith in a prior trade) in the 2010 NFL Draft on August 25, 2009. The move reunited Hochstein with Broncos head coach and former Patriots offensive coordinator Josh McDaniels.

Hochstein started 10 of the 15 games in which he played for the Broncos in 2009. He was placed on season-ending injured reserve with a knee injury on December 28. He was re-signed by the Broncos on March 5, 2010.

Arizona Cardinals
On July 26, 2012, Hochstein signed a one-year contract with the Arizona Cardinals. He was released during the final cutdown period.

Kansas City Chiefs
The Kansas City Chiefs signed Hochstein on September 25, 2012.

References

External links

Arizona Cardinals bio
Denver Broncos bio
New England Patriots bio
Pro-Football-Reference.Com

1977 births
Living people
People from Hartington, Nebraska
Players of American football from Nebraska
American football offensive guards
American football centers
American football fullbacks
American football tight ends
Nebraska Cornhuskers football players
Tampa Bay Buccaneers players
New England Patriots players
Denver Broncos players
Arizona Cardinals players
Kansas City Chiefs players